My Way (also known as The Winners) is a 1973 South African drama film directed by Emil Nofal and Roy Sargeant and starring Joe Stewardson, Richard Loring, Marie Du Toit and Tony Jay. It was followed by a sequel My Way II in 1977.

Cast
 Joe Stewardson - Will Maddox 
 Richard Loring - Paul Maddox 
 Marie Du Toit - Fran Maddox 
 Tony Jay - Natie Kaplan 
 Madeleine Usher - Gillian Scott 
 John Higgins - Barry Maddox 
 Ken Leach - Tony Maddox 
 Diane Ridler - Gina 
 Jenny Meyer - Sandra Maddox 
 Ian Yule - Andy 
 Gregorio Fiasconaro - Mario 
Marcello Fiasconaro - Dave Mc Allister
 Clive Scott - Reporter 
 Barbara Kinghorn - Daisy 
 John Hayter - Doctor 
 Norman Coombes - Chairman

References

Bibliography
 Tomaselli, Keyan. The cinema of apartheid: race and class in South African film. Routledge, 1989.

External links
 

1973 films
1973 drama films
1970s English-language films
English-language South African films
Films directed by Emil Nofal
South African drama films